Grand Forks station is an active train station in Grand Forks, North Dakota. Other uses:

 Grand Forks station (Northern Pacific Railway), a historic train station in Grand Forks, North Dakota
 Grand Forks freight station, a historic freight house in Grand Forks, North Dakota